The 1924–25 season of Atromitos F.C. was the 2nd in the club's history and the first season that the club were participating in the Athens Football Clubs Association League.

The chairman of the team was Andreas Tsouroutsoylou, the person that created the club.

Athens Football Clubs Association League

Competition: There were two groups, from which the top two teams progressed to the final stage, where they played semifinals and then the final to determine the champion.

Atromitos were drafted in Group A and came 1st, making it to the semifinals, where they lost to Panathinaikos and got disqualified.

Group A

Matches

Athens Final Round

References

"Flutter in Glory" by Pavlos Katonis

1924-25
Greek football clubs 1924–25 season